Respeto (Respect) is a 2017 Philippine drama independent film starring Filipino hip hop artist Abra, and directed by Alberto "Treb" Monteras II. It was co-written by Monteras and screenwriter Njel de Mesa, who drew inspiration from the works of veteran poets such as Vim Nadera and National Artists Bienvenido Lumbera and Virgilio Almario.

The final film features a guest cameo appearance by poet Vim Nadera. Aside from Abra and de la Paz, the film co-stars  Chai Fonacier, Ybes Bagadiong, Brian Arda, Thea Yrastorza, Kate Alejandrino, Nor Domingo and Filipino rapper Loonie.

Plot

Cast

Abra as Hendrix
Dido de la Paz as Fortunato "Doc" Reyes
Loonie as Breezy G
Chai Fonacier as Betchai
Ybes Bagadiong  as Payaso
Brian Arda as Mando
Thea Yrastorza as Connie
Kate Alejandrino as Candy
Nor Domingo as Fuentes

Reception
It has received critical acclaim for its powerful use of the Filipino poetry in the form of Pinoy hip hop rap battles and Balagtasan poetry, the performance of veteran theater actor Dido de la Paz, and what film critic Philbert Dy calls its "rather powerful examination of a generational relationship with government-backed violence."

Awards and nominations
The film won the awards for best feature-length film, Best Supporting Actor (Dido de la Paz), Best Editing, Best Cinematography, and Best Sound at the 2017 Cinemalaya Film Festival.

See also 
Pinoy hip hop
Abra (rapper)
Balagtasan
Kiko Boksingero

References

External links
 
 

2017 films
Philippine independent films
Philippine New Wave
2010s Tagalog-language films
Cinemalaya films